Temù is an Italian comune of 1,113 inhabitants (As of 2016) in the province of Brescia, in Lombardy, Italy.

Geography 
It is situated on the river Oglio, in the upper Val Camonica. It is composed of two districts: Pontagna (1.164 m.) and Villa Dalegno (1.380 m.).

Monuments and Attractions

Religious Architecture 

Temù has three main churches:

San Bartolomeo Apostolo: it was renovated in the 19th century and its structure dates back to the 16th century. The gate is made of marble from Vezza d'Oglio.
Sant'Alessandro: it is located in the street which goes to Vione. The structure dates back to the 16th century, but the bell tower dates back to the 13th century.
Santi Martiri: it is situated in Lecanù and dates back to the 16th century.

Culture

Museums 
Temù hosts the Museo della Guerra Bianca in Adamello (Museum of the White War in Adamello).

Economy

Tourism 
Nowadays, despite the presence of beautiful natural resources which could attract tourists, the economy of Temù is based on the residential construction (secondary houses and residence) in relation to the activity of the ski area of Adamello Ski.

In summer tourism is underestimated compared to its richness in natural resources and local traditions, whereas the exploitation of the territory is excessive is winter due to winter sports, for example skiing. This is the main reason why the jobs are mostly seasonal.

Administration

Mayors

Municipalities Union 
Temù is part of the Unione dei Comuni dell'Alta Valle Camonica ("Municipalities Union of High Val Camonica") together with Ponte di Legno, Vione, Vezza d'Oglio, Incudine and Monno. The Unione is based in Ponte di Legno and it was established in 2000. Its surface is 284,10 km².

Union with Ponte di Legno 
On 28 October 2012 the municipality asked residents in a referendum about the union with Ponte di Legno, but the proposal has not been approved and the same happened in 2017.

References 

Cities and towns in Lombardy